The Football League War Cup was an association football tournament held between 1939 and 1945. It aimed to fill the gap left in English football by the suspension of the FA Cup during the Second World War. Though it was often referred to in contemporary coverage as the "League Cup" or "Football League Cup", it is not to be confused with the later English football competition with the same name, which was formed in 1960 and is currently known as the EFL Cup. As with all wartime football in England, records and statistics from the competition are not considered official.

Overview 
The Football League (War) Cup was formed in 1940 to be a replacement for the FA Cup, which had been suspended for the duration of the conflict. Ties were played over two legs in order to boost revenue for clubs. In the 1941–42 season, 16 clubs from London and South East England did not participate owing to a dispute with the Football League over the formation of a separate London League. Instead they competed in the London War Cup. The winners of the London War Cup faced the winners of the Football League War Cup in a play-off. The London clubs re-joined the Football League in the summer of 1942 and the separate London cup competition was discontinued. 

To reduce traveling distances for clubs, after 1942 the competition was split into north and south sections, each with its own final. The South Cup had a round-robin group stage comprising four groups of four clubs who would play each other at home and away, with the group winners advancing to the semi-finals. The North Cup had 48 entrants and used a more complicated format. The standings in the North Football League table after ten matches determined the 32 qualifiers for the competition proper. Teams would then progressively knock each other out in two-legged ties that also counted as league matches. The north final was decided over two legs. The south final was a single match held at Wembley Stadium. The North and South champions would then meet in a play-off to decide the competition's overall winner; play-off matches were held at Stamford Bridge. Gate receipts from the play-off matches were donated to King George's Fund for Sailors.

Results

Finals 

Notes

Northern Final

Southern Final

Finals details

1939–40 

137 games (including replays) were played to get to the final of the inaugural Football League War Cup. These matches were condensed into just 9 weeks. Despite the fears that London would be bombed by the Luftwaffe fans came in thousands to watch the game at Wembley, despite its obvious danger as a bombing target.

1940–41 

In the nine months leading up to the final, 127 large-scale night-raids had taken place, with London, the home of the final, being a regular target. This threat did not stop 60,000 people turning up to watch the game.

Preston North End beat Bury, Bolton, Tranmere Rovers (20-2 on aggregate), Manchester City and Newcastle (2–0 on aggregate) to reach the final. Andrew McLaren had scored nine goals during the tournament, including five goals in Preston's 12–1 home leg win over Tranmere. Thanks to a 40th minute equaliser from Arsenal's D. Compton in the game at Wembley, this was the first final of the tournament to go to a replay.  L. Compton of Arsenal struck the Preston post with a missed penalty in the 3rd minute. 

The replay was moved away from London to Ewood Park. The win for Preston meant that they had completed the first wartime league and cup double, having also won the Northern Regional League.

1941–42 

The third competition in 1942 saw the final switched to a two-legged format with each team playing one leg on their home ground. This was the only time in the tournament's history that the final was decided in such a way.

Eric Robinson of Wolves was to die soon after his team won the tournament, during a military exercise.

On 6 June 1942, Wolves faced Brentford, winners of the London War Cup (clubs from London did not participate in the FLWC that season), in a cup winners play-off held at Stamford Bridge. The match ended 1–1 and was not replayed, so the clubs shared the honour.

1942–43 

In its final three years, the competition was split into north and south halves, with the winners of each section competing in a play-off, staged at Stamford Bridge, to decide the cup winner. The northern winners were decided over two legs, while the southern finalists met in a one-off Wembley final.

The overall final marked the second time Arsenal had got to the final. They would end up being the club who had reached the most Football League War Cup finals, yet did not win once. The final was also notable because both clubs had won their respective wartime divisions.

1943–44 

With the score in the final tied at 1–1 and, due to transport restrictions and bombing threats, a replay not an option, the game ended a draw. Charlton Athletic and Aston Villa shared the 1944 trophy, an event that had not happened before and did not happen again.

1944–45

See also
Association football during World War I
Association football during World War II
London War Cup

References

 
Defunct football cup competitions in England